Springs Branch may refer to

 Springs Branch Canal, a canal branch in Skipton, Yorkshire, England
 Wigan Springs Branch TMD, a railway traction maintenance depot located in Wigan, Lancashire, England